Jeff Kutash (b. 1945) is an American dancer and choreographer.

Early life
Jeff was born in Cleveland, Ohio. As a teen, he was a middleweight Golden Gloves boxer.

Career
Jeff Kutash began his entertainment career in Cleveland, Ohio, as a dancer/choreographer of the musical variety show Upbeat, which was inducted into the Rock 'n Roll Hall of Fame in 2000.  He has choreographed for James Brown, Otis Redding, Jackie Wilson, John Travolta, Muhammad Ali, Michael Jackson, Bette Midler, Cher and Jerry Lewis. He served as a Live Show Attraction Director for Elvis Presley, Dick Clark, Frank Sinatra, Dean Martin, Sammy Davis Jr. and Tom Jones.

Kutash created Las Vegas' first water show, Splash, which was a long-running hit for 20 years and paved the way for O. His unique brand of "Street Dancing" is credited with invigorating Las Vegas' shows for a younger audience, innovating a format that had been held by French-themed revues that filled the nightclubs.

Personal life
Jeff currently resides in Las Vegas, NV. In September 1997, he testified in a trial denying accusations of bribing a judge for a favorable outcome concerning his show Splash in Las Vegas.

References

External links
 

American male dancers
Artists from Cleveland
Living people
1945 births